Raymond Tissot (2 August 1919 – 19 February 1985) was a French athlete. He competed in the men's javelin throw at the 1948 Summer Olympics.

References

External links
 

1919 births
1985 deaths
Athletes (track and field) at the 1948 Summer Olympics
French male javelin throwers
Olympic athletes of France
People from Oyonnax
Sportspeople from Ain